Randy Merkel is a retired American soccer midfielder who played professionally in the USL A-League and Major League Soccer.

Merkel began his collegiate career in 1995 at the Penn State.  He then transferred to the University of Maryland where he played on the men's soccer team from 1996 to 1998.

In February 1997, the Columbus Crew selected Merkel in the third round (thirty-third overall) of the 1999 MLS College Draft.  The Crew released Merkel in the pre-season and he signed with the Raleigh Express of the USL A-League.  In 2001, Merkel moved to the Atlanta Silverbacks.  In June 2001, the Miami Fusion of the Major League Soccer called up Merkel for one game.  The Silverbacks released Merkel in February 2002.

References

External links
 

Living people
1976 births
American soccer players
Atlanta Silverbacks players
Maryland Terrapins men's soccer players
Major League Soccer players
Miami Fusion players
Penn State Nittany Lions men's soccer players
Raleigh (Capital) Express players
A-League (1995–2004) players
Soccer players from Illinois
Sportspeople from DuPage County, Illinois
Columbus Crew draft picks
People from Carol Stream, Illinois
Association football midfielders